This is a list of abbreviations used in law and legal documents. It is common practice in legal documents to cite other publications by using standard abbreviations for the title of each source.  Abbreviations may also be found for common words or legal phrases. Such citations and abbreviations are found in court decisions, statutes, regulations, journal articles, books, and other documents. Below is a basic list of very common abbreviations. Because publishers adopt different practices regarding how abbreviations are printed, one may find abbreviations with or without periods for each letter. For example, the Code of Federal Regulations may appear abbreviated as "C.F.R." or just as "CFR".

Symbol 
 © or [Copr.] or C — Copyright (meaning someone claims ownership of the text, book, music, software, etc.)
 ® — Registered Trademark (typically a word or phrase identifying a company or product, e.g. Coca-Cola)
 ™ — Trademark (interim symbol used after an application for Trademark protection has been filed with the appropriate trademark office (in U.S. - USPTO), but before it has been approved)
 ¶ (Pilcrow) — Paragraph
 ¶¶ — Multiple Paragraphs
 § — section
 §§ — Multiple Sections
 Π (Greek letter Pi) or P — Plaintiff
 Δ (Greek letter delta) or D — Defendant
 ¢ — Claim

0–9 
 1A First Amendment
through
 27A Twenty-Seventh Amendment to the United States Constitution

A
 A. — Atlantic Reporter
 A.2d — Atlantic Reporter, 2nd Series
 a/a/o — as assignee of
 AAS — Acta Apostolicae Sedis
 ABA — American Bar Association
 AC — Appeal Cases (United Kingdom law report)
 ACC — Association of Corporate Counsel
 ad., ads., adsm. —  (Latin), at the suit of. Used in colonial and Federal Era American cases when the defendant is listed first; e.g., "John Doe v. Richard Roe" is labeled "Richard Roe ads. John Doe." The long script "S" of the period often makes this appear as "adj."
 adj. — see "ad." above.
 Ala. Admin. Code — Alabama Administrative Code (unofficial text)
 Ala. Code — Code of Alabama 1975 (unofficial text)
 Alaska Admin. Code — Alaska Administrative Code (unofficial text)
 Alaska Stat. — Alaska Statutes (unofficial text)
 All ER — All England Law Reports
 A.L.R. — American Law Reports
 A.L.R.2d — American Law Reports, 2nd Series
 A.L.R.3d — American Law Reports, 3rd Series
 A.L.R.4th — American Law Reports, 4th Series
 A.L.R.5th — American Law Reports, 5th Series
 A.L.R.6th — American Law Reports, 6th Series
 A.L.R. Fed. — American Law Reports, Federal
 Am. Jur. — American Jurisprudence
 Am. Jur. 2d. — American Jurisprudence, 2nd Series
 Anor — Another
 Anors — Others
 Ap. const. — apostolic constitution
 Ariz. Admin. Code — Arizona Administrative Code (unofficial text)
 Ariz. Admin. Reg. — Arizona Administrative Register (unofficial text)
 Ariz. Rev. Stat. — Arizona Revised Statutes (unofficial text)
 Ark. Code — Arkansas Code (unofficial text)
 Art. – Article
 Artt. – Articles
 A.S.S. — Acta Sanctae Sedis
 ATS — At the suit of
 Atty — Attorney

B
 B. — baron (a judge of various Courts of Exchequer)
 B.A.P. — Bankruptcy Appellate Panel
 BFP — Bona fide purchaser
 Bla.Com. or Bl. Com. — Blackstone's Commentaries on the Laws of England
 b/o — behalf of, on behalf of; see also o/b/o
 BR or B/R — Bankruptcy (also the abbreviation for the United States bankruptcy courts reporter, West's Bankruptcy Reporter)

C
 c. — Canon or chapter
 cc. — Canons or chapters
 CA — Class action
 CB — Casebook
 CBJ — California Bar journal
 CC — Commerce Clause
 CCEO — Codex Canonum Ecclesiarum Orientalium, the Code of Canons of the Eastern Churches
 CCH — Commerce Clearing House, a publisher of case law reporters owned by Wolters Kluwer
 C-C — Counterclaim
 CE — Collateral estoppel
 CD — Closing disclosure
 CL — Common law
 CNeg — Contributory negligence
 CA # — Court of Appeals (Court of Appeals for the #th Circuit)
 CA Fed. — Court of Appeals for the Federal Circuit
 Cx — Constitution
 Cx-C — Cross-claim
 Cxl — Constitutional
 Cal. Code — California Code (unofficial text?)
 Cal. Code Reg. — California Code of Regulations (see: CCR below)
 CCR — California Code of Regulations (official text?) (source: Thomson/West)
 Cert. — Certiorari (appeal to a higher court)
 CIC — Codex Iuris Canonici, the Code of Canon Law (further specified as 1983 CIC or 1917 CIC)
 CIF — Coming into force
 C.F.R. — Code of Federal Regulations
 CFR — Call for Response (At the US Supreme Court, if the other side has stated it will not respond to a petition for cert., any Justice may direct the Clerk to call for a response.)
 CJS — Corpus Juris Secundum
 CLSA — Canon Law Society of America
 Co. Lit. or Co. Litt. — Coke on Littleton 
 Cong. Rec. — Congressional Record
 Cor. — Coram, a cause heard "in the presence of" an auditor of the Roman Rota
 CRS — Congressional Research Service
 Ct. Cl. — the United States Court of Federal Claims Reporter
 C — Contract

D
 Δ (Greek letter delta) or D — Defendant
 DAC — Days After Contract
 d/b/a — doing business as
 Decr. — Decretum
 DLR — Dominion Law Reports (Canadian law report)
 DoCRA — Duty of Care Risk Analysis Standard

E
 ER — Employer
 EE — Employee
 et als. — et alia, Latin for "and others"
 et seq. — et sequens, Latin for "and following"

F
 F. — Federal Reporter
 F.2d — Federal Reporter, 2nd Series
 F.3d — Federal Reporter, 3rd Series
 F.App'x — Federal Appendix
 F.Cas. — Federal Cases 1789–1880
 Fed. Reg. (sometimes FR) — Federal Register (see Federal Register for full text from 1994 to date)
 Fed. R. Bankr. P. — Federal Rules of Bankruptcy Procedure
 Fed. R. Civ. P. (sometimes FRCP) — Federal Rules of Civil Procedure
 Fed. R. Crim. P. — Federal Rules of Criminal Procedure
 Fed. R. Evid. (sometimes FRE) — Federal Rules of Evidence
 f/k/a — formerly known as
 F. Supp. — Federal Supplement
 F. Supp. 2d — Federal Supplement, 2nd Series
 f/t/a — failed to appear

G
 GAL — Guardian ad litem
 GATT — General Agreement on Tariffs and Trade
 GC — General Counsel
 GVR — Grant, Vacate, and Remand
 NGO — Non Government Organization

H
 HC — Hypothetical Client
 HDC — Holder in due course

I
 I.L.M. — International Legal Materials
 IRB — Internal Revenue Bulletin (from July 2003 to date)
 ILRM — Irish Law Reports Monthly
 IR — Irish Law Reports
 IRC — Internal Revenue Code
 ISLN — International Standard Lawyer Number
 Instr. — Instructio, a kind of decree (canon law)

J
 J — Judge or Justice or Journal, according to jurisdiction
 JA – Appellate judge
 JD — Juris Doctor
 JCD — Juris Canonici Doctor, Doctor of Canon Law
 JCL — Juris Canonici Licentiatus, Licentiate of Canon Law
 JJ — Judges or Justices, plural
 JMOL — Judgment as a matter of law
 JNOV — Judgment notwithstanding verdict
 Jx — Jurisdiction
 JU — disposed of by Judge
 JUST. — Justice

K
 K — Contract

L
 L/C — Letter of credit
 L.Ed — Lawyers' Edition
 L.Ed.2d — Lawyers 2nd Edition
 LL.B. – Legum Baccalaureus — Bachelor of Laws
 LLC — Limited liability company
 LL.D. – Legum Doctor — Doctor of Law
 LL.M. – Legum Magister — Master of Laws
 LLP — Limited liability partnership

M
 MIL — Motion in limine
 MOU — Memorandum of Understanding
 M.P. — motu proprio
 MPC — Model Penal Code
 MR — Master of the Rolls
 MSJ — Motion for summary judgment

N
 NDA — Non-Disclosure Agreement
 n/k/a — Now Known As
 N.E. — North Eastern Reporter
 N.E.2d — North Eastern Reporter, 2nd Series
 No. — Number
 N.W. — North Western Reporter
 N.W.2d — North Western Reporter, 2nd Series

O
 o/b/o — on behalf of
 Opp'n — opposition
 Ors — "Others" (see also, Anor, Anors)

P
 ¶ (Pilcrow) — Paragraph
 Π (Greek letter Pi) — Plaintiff
 P. — Pacific Reporter
 P.2d — Pacific Reporter, 2nd Series
 P.3d — Pacific Reporter, 3rd Series
 p. — Page
 pp. — Pages
 PL — Public Law
 POA — power of attorney
 Prae. — Praenotanda
 Pty – proprietary company
 Pub.L. — Public Law

Q
 QDRO — Qualified Domestic Relations Order

R
 R — Rex or Regina
 RCW — Revised Code of Washington
 R.E. or R/E — Real Estate
 Reh'g — Rehearing
 Relv. — Relevant
 Rescr. — Rescriptum
 Resp. — Responsum
 Resp't — Respondent
 Rev. Proc. — Revenue Procedure (published in IRB)
 Rev. Rul. — Revenue Ruling (published in IRB)
 RJ – Restorative justice
R.O.I - Release of Information
 Canon law: Regulæ Juris of Boniface VIII (sometimes abbreviated "RI")
 Common law: Recurring Judgement. (published in All In Reports)
 R.I.A.A. — Reports of International Arbitral Awards

S
 § or s. — Section
 §§ ss. — Multiple Sections
 sc. — scilicet
 sd — said
 S.C.R. (or SCR) — Supreme Court Reports (Supreme Court of Canada)
 S. Ct. — Supreme Court Reporter (Supreme Court of the United States)
 S.E. — South Eastern Reporter
 S.E.2d — South Eastern Reporter, 2nd Series
 SCOTUS — Supreme Court of the United States (Supreme Court of the United States)
 SI — Statutory instruments
 S/J — Summary judgment
 SMJ — Subject-matter jurisdiction
 So. — Southern Reporter
 So. 2d — Southern Reporter, 2nd Series
 SOL — Statute of Limitations
 SOR — Statutory Orders and Regulations
 S.R.R. — Sacræ Rotæ Romanæ, the Tribunal of the Roman Rota
 SRRDec — Sacræ Rotæ Romanæ Decisiones
 Stat. — United States Statutes at Large (See United States Code)
 S.W. — South Western Reporter
 S.W.2d — South Western Reporter, 2nd Series
 S.W.3d — South Western Reporter, 3rd Series

T
 T.C. — Reported decisions of the United States Tax Court
 T.D. — Treasury Decision
 ™ or TM — Trademark (such as a word or phrase identifying a company or product)

U
 UD — Unnatural Death (used in FIR)
 UCC — Uniform Commercial Code
 UCMJ — Uniform Code of Military Justice (Laws of the U.S. military)
 UPC — Uniform Probate Code
 U.S. — United States Reports (beginning with v. 502 (1991))
 USC — United States Code (A free website for the full text is at U.S. Code. This text is maintained by the U.S. Gov't Printing Office, but must be checked for revisions or amendments after its effective date.)
 USCA — United States Code Annotated
 USCCAN — United States Code Congressional and Administrative News
 USCS — United States Code Service
 UST — United States Treaties and Other International Agreements (See Treaty series.)

V
 v. — versus. Used when plaintiff is listed first on a case title. John Doe v. Richard Roe.
See also "ad." above. "vs." is used in most scholarly writing in other fields, but "v." alone in legal writing.

W
 WAC — Washington Administrative Code
 WTO — World Trade Organization
 W. Va. Code — West Virginia Code (unofficial text)
 WOP or w/o/p — without prejudice

X
 XFD — Examination for Discovery
XN — Examination in Chief
 XXN — Cross-examination

Y

Z

See also
 List of legal abbreviations (canon law)

References 

 Beal, John P. et al., eds. New Commentary on the Code of Canon Law (New York/Mahway, NJ: Paulist Press, 2000).

Further reading
 Columbia Law Review Association, Inc., Harvard Law Review Association, University of Pennsylvania Law Review, and Yale Law Journal (Eds.) (2015). The Bluebook: A Uniform System of Citation. 20th ed. Cambridge, MA: Harvard Law Review Association.
 Garner, Brian. Black's Law Dictionary. 10th ed. St. Paul, MN: West Pub. Co., 2014.
 Jowitt's Dictionary of English Law. 4th ed., 2015.
 McGill Law Journal. Canadian Guide to Uniform Legal Citation. 6th ed. Toronto: Carswell, 2006.
 Prince, Mary Miles. Bieber's Dictionary of Legal Abbreviations. 6th ed. Buffalo, NY: Hein, 2009. 
 Trinxet, Salvador. Trinxet Dictionary of Legal Abbreviations and Acronyms Series. A Law Reference Collection, 2011,  and 
 Trinxet, Salvador.
 Raistrick, Donald. Index to Legal Citations and Abbreviations. 3rd ed. London: Sweet & Maxwell, 2008. This book focuses more on British and non-American/international abbreviations.
 Kavass, World Dictionary of Legal Abbreviations

External links
 Legal acronyms and abbreviations, Retrieved 2014-30-06.
 Abbreviations and Acronyms of the U.S. Government (maintained by U.S. Government Publishing Office)
 The Cardiff Index to Legal Abbreviations (maintained by Cardiff University).
 Common Abbreviations and Legal Citation Examples for Selected Federal Government Documents: Legislative, Regulatory and Statutory (maintained by LLSDC.org)

Abbreviations

Legal citation
Legal